Édouard Pouteil-Noble (25 August 1902 – 7 July 1973) was a French cross-country skier. He competed in the men's 50 kilometre event at the 1924 Winter Olympics.

References

External links
 

1902 births
1973 deaths
French male cross-country skiers
Olympic cross-country skiers of France
Cross-country skiers at the 1924 Winter Olympics
Sportspeople from Isère
20th-century French people